Shahu Tushar Mane (born 26 January 2002) is an Indian sport shooter. He won the Gold medal in the ISSF world cup 10m Air Pistol mixed event along with Mehuli Ghosh .

References

Living people
2002 births
Indian male sport shooters
Shooters at the 2018 Summer Youth Olympics
Medalists at the 2018 Summer Youth Olympics
21st-century Indian people